Stephen Noel Bateman (born 6 January 1958 in Christchurch) is a former New Zealand cricketer who played for the Canterbury Wizards. He is the cousin of Glenn Bateman.

External links 
  from Cricinfo.

References

1958 births
Living people
New Zealand cricketers
Canterbury cricketers
South Island cricketers